Health Psychology is a monthly, peer-reviewed academic journal published by the American Psychological Association. The journal is "devoted to understanding the scientific relations among psychological factors, behavior and physical health and illness." The editor-in-chief is Kenneth E. Freedland (Washington University in St. Louis).

Abstracting and indexing
This journal is abstracted and indexed in:

According to the Journal Citation Reports, the journal has a 2021 impact factor of 5.556".

See also
 Journal of Health Psychology
Occupational health psychology

References

External links
 
 APA Division 38, Health Psychology

Health psychology journals
American Psychological Association academic journals
Bimonthly journals
Publications established in 1982
English-language journals
1982 establishments in the United States